The  began on 4 September 2010 and ended on 1 January 2011 with the final at National Stadium in Tokyo, Japan. Gamba Osaka were the two-time defending champions, having won two previous tournaments.

Kashima Antlers won the tournament and was awarded a 2011 AFC Champions League berth.

Calendar

Participants

Starting in the First Round
Prefectural finals winners – 47 teams

Hokkaidō – Sapporo University
Aomori – Vanraure Hachinohe
Iwate – Grulla Morioka
Miyagi – Sony Sendai
Akita – Blaublitz Akita
Yamagata – Yamagata University
Fukushima – Fukushima United
Ibaraki – Ryutsu Keizai University
Tochigi – Tochigi Uva
Gunma – Arte Takasaki
Saitama – Tokyo International University
Chiba – Juntendo University
Tokyo – Tokyo Verdy Youth
Kanagawa – YSCC Yokohama
Niigata – Japan Soccer College
Toyama – Toyama Shinjo Club
Ishikawa – Zweigen Kanazawa
Fukui – Saurcos Fukui
Yamanashi – Tamaho Club
Nagano – Matsumoto Yamaga
Gifu – FC Gifu Second
Shizuoka – Honda FC
Aichi – Chukyo University
Mie – Yokkaichi University
Shiga – MIO Biwako Shiga
Kyoto – SP Kyoto
Osaka – Osaka University of Health and Sport Sciences
Hyōgo – Kwansei Gakuin University
Nara – Nara Club
Wakayama – Arterivo Wakayama
Tottori – Yonago Kita High School
Shimane – Dezzolla Shimane
Okayama – International Pacific University
Hiroshima – Sagawa Kyubin Chugoku
Yamaguchi – Renofa Yamaguchi
Tokushima – Tokushima Vortis Second
Kagawa – Kamatamare Sanuki
Ehime – Ehime FC Shimanami
Kochi – Kochi University
Fukuoka – Fukuoka University of Education
Saga – Saga University
Nagasaki – V-Varen Nagasaki
Kumamoto – Kumamoto Gakuen University High School
Ōita – HOYO Atletico ELAN
Miyazaki – Honda Lock
Kagoshima – National Institute of Fitness and Sports in Kanoya
Okinawa – FC Ryukyu

Prime Minister Cup University football tournament winners – 1 team
Komazawa University

Starting in the Second Round
J.League Division 1 – 18 teams

Vegalta Sendai
Montedio Yamagata
Kashima Antlers
Omiya Ardija
Urawa Red Diamonds
FC Tokyo
Kawasaki Frontale
Yokohama F. Marinos
Shonan Bellmare
Shimizu S-Pulse
Júbilo Iwata
Nagoya Grampus
Albirex Niigata
Kyoto Sanga
Cerezo Osaka
Gamba Osaka
Vissel Kobe
Sanfrecce Hiroshima

J.League Division 2 – 19 teams

Consadole Sapporo
Mito HollyHock
Tochigi SC
Thespa Kusatsu
Kashiwa Reysol
JEF United Chiba
Tokyo Verdy
Yokohama FC
Ventforet Kofu
Kataller Toyama
FC Gifu
Fagiano Okayama
Tokushima Vortis
Ehime FC
Giravanz Kitakyushu
Avispa Fukuoka
Sagan Tosu
Roasso Kumamoto
Oita Trinita

Japan Football League – 3 teams 

Gainare Tottori
Sagawa Shiga
Machida Zelvia

※Clubs ranked from first to third at the end of the 17th week of 2010 Japan Football League.

Matches
All matches are Japan Standard Time (UTC+09:00)

First round

Second round

Third round

Fourth round

Quarter finals

Semi finals

Final

External links
 Official site of the 90th Emperor's Cup 

2010 domestic association football cups
2010
2010 in Japanese football
2011 in Japanese football